The Miracle of the Jealous Husband   is a fresco by the Italian Renaissance master Titian, executed in 1511 as part of the decoration of the Scuola del Santo in Padua, northern Italy.

It portrays a man stabbing his wife after she has been unjustly accused of adultery. When the man discovers the truth, he begs for pardon to St. Anthony, who resuscitates the woman (this scene is portrayed in smaller size on the right). The idyllic background is inspired by Giorgione's paintings.

The young Titian described the volume of the wife's raised arm, in the center of the action, by actually sculpting it in relief rather than describing it illusionistically.

Notes

References

Sergio Rossetti Morosini, "Titian, The Miracle of the Jealous Husband, 1511", in New Findings in Titian's Fresco Technique at the Scuola del Santo in Padua, The Art Bulletin; March 1999, Volume LXXXI Number 1.

1511 paintings
Religious paintings by Titian
Paintings in Padua